This is a list of all hat-tricks scored in the Copa América; that is, the occasions where an individual footballer scored three or more goals in a single Copa América match. This is a relatively rare event: only 69 hat-tricks have been scored across the 47 editions of the Copa América tournament to date. As CONMEBOL is the governing body of football in South America, official hat-tricks are only noted when CONMEBOL recognizes that at least three goals were scored by one player in one match.

The first hat-trick was scored by Arthur Friedenreich of Brazil, playing against Chile in the 1919 South American Championship; the most recent was by Eduardo Vargas of Chile, playing against Mexico in the 2016 Copa América Centenario.

The only editions not to have at least one hat-trick scored were 1916, 1917, 1920, 1921, 1922, 1937, 1956, 1979, 1983, 1989, 1991, 1993, 1995, 1997, 1999, 2001 and 2019. The record number of hat-tricks in a single Copa América tournament is five, which occurred in each of the 1926, 1942, 1945 and 1957 tournaments.

Notable Copa América hat-tricks

 Arthur Friedenreich was the first player to score a hat-trick in a Copa América match, doing so on 11 May 1919 for Brazil against Chile.
 Ten players have scored two hat-tricks in Copa América matches: Ademir (1945 and 1949), Javier Ambrois (both 1957), David Arellano (both 1926), Teodoro Fernández (1939 and 1941), Herminio Masantonio (1935 and 1942), Pedro Petrone (1924 and 1927), Sylvio Pirillo (both 1942), José Sanfilippo (both 1959 (Ecuador)), Severino Varela (1939 and 1942) and Paolo Guerrero (2011 and 2015).
 Héctor Scarone, Juan Marvezzi, José Manuel Moreno and Evaristo are the only players in Copa América history to have scored five goals in a single match.
 There have been three occasions when two hat-tricks have been scored in the same match; when Uruguay defeated Bolivia in 1927, Pedro Petrone and Roberto Figueroa, both playing for Uruguay, scored three goals. Another occurred during the 1942 South American Championship: when Argentina defeated Ecuador, José Manuel Moreno scored five goals and Herminio Masantonio scored four, both for Argentina.
 The quickest hat-trick to be completed was José Manuel Moreno's three goals in ten minutes during the 1942 edition. He scored his third goal in the 22nd minute, after scoring his first in the 12th minute and his second in the 16th.
 The only players to have scored a hat-trick coming from the bench are Paulo Valentim in 1959 and Lionel Messi in 2016.
 Although the Copa América Centenario was a special edition, hat-tricks scored in that tournament are listed here.
 No player has scored a hat-trick against Argentina, nor has there been a hat-trick scored by a player for Bolivia, Ecuador or Venezuela.

List

See also 
 Copa América
 Copa América records and statistics

References

External links 
 The Copa América Archive

Copa América records and statistics
Copa America
Copa America